Cora imi is a species of basidiolichen in the family Hygrophoraceae. Found in Costa Rica, it was formally described as a new species in 2016 by Robert Lücking, José Luis Chaves, and James D. Lawrey. The specific epithet imi is an acronym for the International Mycological Institute. Here it was growing on the ground in páramo among bryophytes.

References

imi
Lichen species
Lichens described in 2016
Lichens of Central America
Taxa named by Robert Lücking
Taxa named by James D. Lawrey
Basidiolichens